The 2012 Tour de France began on 30 June, and stage 10 occurred on 11 July. The 2012 edition began with a prologue – a short individual time trial stage – where each member of the starting peloton of 198 riders competed against the clock – in Liège, Belgium with two more stages held in the country before moving back into France. The race resumed in Orchies for the start of the third stage; also during the first half of the race, the peloton visited Switzerland for the finish to the eighth stage in Porrentruy, and contested another individual time trial stage – having returned to France – the following day.

Fabian Cancellara held the lead of the race throughout its opening Belgian leg; having won the race-commencing prologue, Cancellara defended it on the following two stages before the race returned to France. Cancellara maintained his overall lead for the rest of the race's first week, before eventually losing time on the first true mountain stage of the race – stage seven – as he was dropped on the closing climb to La Planche des Belles Filles. As a result, Bradley Wiggins assumed the maillot jaune, becoming the first British rider to wear the jersey since 2000. Wiggins maintained the lead for the following three stages, including his first victory at the Tour during the ninth stage individual time trial in Besançon. Wiggins held a lead of almost two minutes in the overall standings with the more mountainous second half of the Tour still to race. Two riders won multiple stages during the first half of the race; Peter Sagan, in his first Tour de France, won three stages and also held the lead of the points classification, while André Greipel took back-to-back stage victories on the fourth and fifth stages. World champion Mark Cavendish achieved one stage victory, while French riders Thibaut Pinot and Thomas Voeckler each took breakaway victories.

The race was also marked by several large crashes, most notably on the sixth stage, when the majority of the field crashed with around  remaining. In total, twelve riders had to abandon the race due to injuries suffered during the crash. During the race's first rest day – held after the ninth stage individual time trial – the team hotel of the  squad, in Bourg-en-Bresse, was searched by French police and gendarmerie. One of team's riders in the Tour, Rémy Di Gregorio, was arrested in relation to an ongoing anti-doping case, and was immediately suspended by the French team; although the case had been open since 2011, when Di Gregorio was a member of the  team.

Classification standings

Prologue

30 June 2012 — Liège (Belgium), (ITT)

The prologue was a short and fairly flat circuit around Liège, with expected stage times to be about eight minutes. The start ramp was located at Avenue Rogier next to the Parc d'Avroy; the riders then headed north by the Boulevard d'Avroy and Boulevard de la Sauvenière. They then followed the Quai Roosevelt, along the Meuse, until the midway point when they returned on the opposite carriageway, before turning right towards Place Saint-Lambert, in front of the Palais des Princes-Évêques. From there, the riders rejoined the original route on the opposite carriageway of Boulevard de la Sauvenière before the finish line located on Boulevard d'Avroy on the opposite side of the Parc d'Avroy from the start.

With several tight corners, the prologue was expected to favour riders with good bike handling skills. The first rider to leave the start house in Liège was 's Tom Veelers, with most of the general classification contenders going towards the end of the starting order, as rain was not scheduled to disrupt the race. Veelers set a time of 7' 47" for the course – which was near-identical to the 2004 prologue held in the city, won by then- rider Fabian Cancellara, over a  parcours – but this was immediately beaten by  rider Simon Gerrans, who went five seconds quicker around the course. Gerrans' lead was also not to last for long, as Ukrainian national champion Andriy Hryvko bettered his mark by 14 seconds; the time was ultimately good enough for tenth place in the stage results. Hryvko held the lead for over an hour, as no other rider could get within three seconds of his time at that point.

It was not until Gerrans' teammate Brett Lancaster, a former prologue winner at the Giro d'Italia, that Hryvko's time was beaten; Lancaster recorded a time four seconds quicker, crossing the line at 7' 24".  rider Edvald Boasson Hagen marginally bettered Lancaster's time to assume the lead for a time, but French champion Sylvain Chavanel set a mark of 7' 20" for the course. His time held until the final ten riders to take to the course; Bradley Wiggins trailed Chavanel by six seconds at the intermediate time-check – coming around halfway through the test – but paced the second half better to negate the deficit, and beat the time of Chavanel by around half a second. Cancellara, the pre-stage favourite, recorded the fastest time of 3' 35" to the intermediate point, and extended his eventual stage-winning margin to seven seconds by the finish; in the process, Cancellara won his fifth Tour prologue stage, a record.

Of other overall contenders, defending champion Cadel Evans, 's Vincenzo Nibali and  rider Ryder Hesjedal, the winner of May's Giro d'Italia, all placing solidly inside the top twenty riders. Nibali's teammate Peter Sagan and world time trial champion Tony Martin, who both had been tipped as favourites to win the stage, both encountered difficulties on the course during their respective runs. Sagan lost time after he overshot one of the 180-degree hairpin bends and had to clip out of the pedals, while Martin – who had set a similar time to teammate Chavanel at the intermediate time-check – suffered a puncture, and ultimately finished 23 seconds down on Cancellara's time.

Stage 1

1 July 2012 — Liège (Belgium) to Seraing (Belgium), 

The Tour remained in Belgium for the first full day's racing with a stage through the rolling countryside of the Ardennes. After four Category 4 climbs en route, the race finished at Seraing, a municipality just outside Liège.

By this point, Mørkøv and Urtasun had both scored a point towards the mountains classification, having led over the Côte de Cokaifagne and the Côte de Francorchamps respectively. Overall leader Fabian Cancellara was being paced by his  teammates, and help to stabilise the gap to the leaders at around three minutes. Mørkøv then proceeded to win the two remaining climbs on the day, to take the race's first polka-dot jersey, becoming only the third Danish rider to have held the lead of that classification.

The field remained together onto the Côte de Seraing, but halfway up the climb, Cancellara attacked and only Peter Sagan could hold pace with him. 's Edvald Boasson Hagen later bridged up to the duo, and it was left to the three riders to fight it out for the stage win, with the reduced peloton chasing behind. Cancellara attacked first, but Sagan came around the outside and freewheeled to his fourteenth victory of 2012, ahead of Cancellara – who maintained his overall lead – and Boasson Hagen. Gilbert led home the peloton in fourth, as 22-year-old Sagan became the youngest rider to win a Tour stage since Lance Armstrong in 1993.

Stage 2

2 July 2012 — Visé (Belgium) to Tournai (Belgium), 

The race remained in Belgium for one more day with a flat course heading almost due west from Visé. There was one fourth-category climb of the Côte de la Citadelle de Namur during the stage, but it was expected to ultimately result in a sprint finish in Tournai.

 took up duties at the front of the peloton in order to reduce the gap that the leaders had held; although by the time that Mørkøv scored the point for crossing the summit of the Côte de la Citadelle de Namur first, around  later, the lead had only been reduced to around six-and-a-half minutes. With around  remaining of the stage, Roux attacked his two fellow breakaway companions, going off on his own as Mørkøv and Kern allowed themselves to fall back into the confines of the main field.

Roux managed to gain an advantage of almost a minute, but he too was brought back by the main field inside the final  of the stage. ,  and  held the front with  sprinter Marcel Kittel falling off the back of the field, as he was suffering from stomach problems; instead their focus would be left with his lead-out man Tom Veelers. The field remained together for the sprint finish in Tournai;  led it out for Greipel, with Sagan just behind. Cavendish launched his sprint off Greipel's wheel with  left, and got the better of him by half a wheel to take his 21st Tour stage victory, moving out of a tie with Luxembourg's Nicolas Frantz for sixth place on the all-time Tour stage wins list. Greipel, Goss, Veelers and 's Alessandro Petacchi completed the top five on the stage, with Sagan taking the points classification lead, and the green jersey, from 's Fabian Cancellara with sixth place. Cancellara maintained his seven-second overall lead over Cavendish's teammate Bradley Wiggins.

Stage 3

3 July 2012 — Orchies to Boulogne-sur-Mer, 

Following its three-day opening salvo in Belgium, the Tour moved back to France, starting in Orchies – where the fifth stage team time trial of the 1982 race was abandoned in progress due to industrial action – before heading west towards Boulogne-sur-Mer. Like the first stage, the course was ideally favoured towards the puncheurs.

There was a fast-paced start to the stage with several short and punchy attacks, but were closed down immediately. Their lead eventually reached a maximum of over five-and-a-half minutes before  and  made their presence at the front of the peloton, for their respective classification leaders Fabian Cancellara (overall) and Peter Sagan (points). The breakaway again scored the major points at the intermediate sprint point in Senlecques;  rider Mark Cavendish won the bunch sprint for sixth place, despite being boxed in by 's Kenny van Hummel, with the two riders later exchanging words.

Mørkøv extended his mountains lead by crossing each of the first two climbs ahead of his rivals, while behind, several large crashes in the peloton took down a number of riders. Two riders suffered fractures and had to abandon on the route: 's Kanstantsin Sivtsov (tibia) and 's José Joaquín Rojas (collarbone). Mørkøv and Hryvko dropped their breakaway companions, and managed to hold off until  to go when Mørkøv cracked on the Côte du Mont Lambert. Hryvko held off until the top of the climb, where he was then caught himself. Sagan comfortably took the sprint for the line, holding enough of a lead to free-wheel the closing metres and performing a "running man" salute akin to Tom Hanks's character in 1994 film Forrest Gump. A one-second time difference between Sagan and the field – led home by 's Edvald Boasson Hagen, Peter Velits and Cancellara – was announced by the organisers, with all riders that were delayed in a crash in the closing metres, given the same time as Boasson Hagen et al.

Stage 4

4 July 2012 — Abbeville to Rouen, 

The first half of the stage followed the coast of Picardy and Normandy along the English Channel through Dieppe to the intermediate sprint point of Fécamp, before turning inland towards the finish at Rouen, with four fourth-category climbs during the  parcours.

A three-rider breakaway was formed in the early kilometres of the stage, with the riders all representing French-licensed Professional Continental teams. Home riders David Moncoutié and Anthony Delaplace were joined by Japan's Yukiya Arashiro representing , as they set about gaining an advantage of over eight-and-a-half minutes from the main field. On the day, Moncoutié and Delaplace would ultimately share the four categorised climbs between them, each scoring two points towards the mountains classification; while Arashiro, the best sprinter among the trio, took maximum points at Fécamp. The now-customary bunch sprint for the minor points was again taken by 's Mark Cavendish, after launching his sprint off the rear wheel of 's Matthew Goss. A light rain shower hit the race with around  remaining, before the first crash of the day with 's Jonathan Cantwell and Sagan's teammate Vincenzo Nibali among those delayed, but both would later rejoin the main field.

Six more riders looked to join the leading trio but all riders were eventually brought back  ahead of the finish. Inside the final , another crash took down a number of riders including Cavendish and lead-out man Bernhard Eisel, as well as the  duo Robert Hunter and Tyler Farrar. Alessandro Petacchi beat 's Tom Veelers to the line for second, with Goss and Sagan – the latter despite being delayed by the late-stage crash – rounding out the top five.

Stage 5

5 July 2012 — Rouen to Saint-Quentin, 

This was a very flat day's racing heading in a north-easterly direction with no rated climbs, with a wide straight finish in the Champs-Élysées Park. As a result, the stage was expected to favour the sprinters. Almost immediately after the peloton rolled out of the start in Rouen, 's Mathieu Ladagnous, was the first rider to break the confines of the main field and was allowed to go clear without resistance.

It was at that point that Marcel Kittel, 's main sprinter, abandoned the race due to his ongoing gastroenteritis. The leaders held an advantage of around three minutes as they approached the intermediate sprint point in Breteuil, coming after  of the parcours. Ladagnous took the maximum points on offer, as the four leaders rolled through the line without competition. As it was the previous day, Mark Cavendish led the main field across the line, ahead of 's Matthew Goss and  rider Mark Renshaw. The gap remained around the three-minute mark until  to go, when it was gradually brought back by the peloton. At , the lead quartet held a lead of 20 seconds, while in the peloton, another big crash occurred; among those hitting the tarmac were points leader Peter Sagan and 's Tyler Farrar.

Farrar, suffering his fourth crash of the race, fell after a clash of elbows with  rider Tom Veelers; after the stage, an angered Farrar tried to board the  team bus to voice his feelings towards Veelers, but was escorted away by  staff, including general manager Jonathan Vaughters. Ghyselinck attacked with just  remaining, gaining some space from his three breakaway companions. Goss launched his sprint first, with Ghyselinck's teammate Samuel Dumoulin on his wheel; but for the second stage running, it was André Greipel who took victory ahead of Goss, 's Juan José Haedo, Dumoulin and Cavendish. 's Fabian Cancellara maintained the yellow jersey – earning the 27th of his career – which set a record for a rider not to have won the Tour, surpassing France's René Vietto.

Stage 6

6 July 2012 — Épernay to Metz, 

The race finished near the Centre Pompidou where another bunch sprint was expected. Once again, it was a four-rider breakaway that was allowed to be instigated in the early kilometres. They later established a maximum lead of around six-and-a-half minutes early in the stage.

Around  into the stage, there was a minor crash involving the winner of the previous two stages, André Greipel, and overall contenders Robert Gesink and Alejandro Valverde amongst others. Zabriskie crossed the summit of the Côte de Buxières first to claim the point on offer for the mountains classification, while in the peloton, there was another minor crash; Greipel was involved again, as were his teammate Jelle Vanendert and 's Bauke Mollema. Again, the peloton splintered due to the crashes, but due to a reduction in pace, those delayed were able to rejoin the main field.

With  of the day's stage remaining, a much larger crash delayed the majority of the field. According to 's Danilo Hondo, the crash was caused by his teammate Davide Viganò while adjusting his jersey and fell into a ditch, causing other riders to stack up behind. Amongst the riders that were delayed by the crash were Fränk Schleck, Steven Kruijswijk, Gesink, Mollema, Valverde, Vanendert, 's Michele Scarponi, 's Pierre Rolland and the entire  team with the exception of Zabriskie. Cavendish was also delayed, but although he was able to avoid the crash, he picked up a puncture in the process. Four riders abandoned the race on the route due to injuries suffered; 's Tom Danielson – who had already been racing with a separated shoulder – suffered trauma to his other shoulder, hip and arm, and was sent to hospital; he was joined there by Viganò (damaged shoulder), 's Mikel Astarloza (dislocated elbow), and 's Wout Poels, who tried to ride on for  but eventually had to abandon; he was later diagnosed with a ruptured spleen and kidney, as well as three broken ribs and bruised lungs.

After the crash, the race had split into many distinct groups; the breakaway still held a minute's lead over a reduced peloton of around sixty riders, with those delayed in several more groups a few minutes and more behind. With nearly all of their riders able to get through the chaos,  took up pace-making on the front of the peloton, in the hopes of getting Goss the stage victory. With Edvald Boasson Hagen and Ryder Hesjedal among those delayed, Sagan moved into the top ten overall along with Maxime Monfort, as Monfort's teammate Fabian Cancellara maintained the overall lead once again.

Stage 7

7 July 2012 — Tomblaine to La Planche des Belles Filles, 

An initial breakaway of nineteen riders went clear after , but it was eventually reduced to seven riders, representing seven different teams, by the time the race reached the  mark. They eventually established a lead of nearly six minutes around a third of the way through the stage; by the intermediate sprint point in Gérardmer, it had been reduced by a minute, as Cyril Gautier took the twenty points for first over the line, and Peter Sagan extended his points lead by one, as he beat Matthew Goss in the main field sprint, for eighth place. 's Chris Anker Sørensen crossed both of the third-category climbs first ahead of 's Luis León Sánchez, but the peloton started reducing their advantage by each passing kilometre. 's Dmitry Fofonov launched an attack at the front, which dislodged Gautier from the lead group; the peloton remained a minute in arrears, with  holding station and setting the tempo, protecting Bradley Wiggins from any danger.

Sørensen and 's Michael Albasini were the last of the leaders to be caught, with just over  remaining.  continued to break the peloton apart, and by the time the leaders had reached the flamme rouge, only five riders remained at the front – Wiggins and his teammate Chris Froome, 's Cadel Evans,  rider Vincenzo Nibali and Rein Taaramäe of  – for the closing kilometre. Evans hit the final corner first, but Froome looked strongest on the steepest part of the climb, and he eventually went past him and Wiggins, accelerating away to a two-second time gap over his rivals. With 's Fabian Cancellara losing almost two minutes on the day, he surrendered the yellow jersey to Wiggins, who became the fifth British rider to wear the jersey, and first since David Millar in 2000. Froome assumed the polka-dot jersey thanks to the stage victory, while Taaramäe took the white jersey from Evans' teammate Tejay van Garderen.

Stage 8

8 July 2012 — Belfort to Porrentruy (Switzerland), 

Ten riders made the immediate breakaway from the peloton, but the gap that they had achieved was closed down by the  team ahead of the day's first climb, the Côte de Bondeval. Jens Voigt of  attacked off the front of the lead group to take the point on offer for the mountains classification, and was joined by several more riders on the descent; however, the group only held a gap of twenty seconds at the  mark.

Roy was joined by  rider Fredrik Kessiakoff on the day's fourth climb, the Côte de Saignelégier, while a 22-rider chase group formed behind the duo. Steven Kruijswijk and 's Kevin De Weert left that group, and soon joined up with the two leaders on the Côte de Saulcy, before Kessiakoff left them behind, after attacking once again. He held a lead of 1' 45" over the dwindling chase group on the penultimate climb, the Côte de la Caquerelle, and eventually the group had reduced to just French pairing Tony Gallopin and Roy's teammate Thibaut Pinot, the youngest rider in the Tour.

Gallopin lost ground to Pinot on the final climb, and soon Pinot was chasing after Kessiakoff on the climb itself; he ultimately caught him towards the summit of the climb. Kessiakoff could not stick with Pinot on the climb, with Pinot crossing the summit with a 12-second advantage over Kessiakoff. The group of overall contenders had also been reduced, with 's Jelle Vanendert setting the tempo for teammate Jurgen Van den Broeck, around a minute-and-a-half behind Pinot. With boisterous support from his team manager Marc Madiot, Pinot maintained an advantage of a minute into the final , as Kessiakoff was swept up by the small chasing group. Van Den Broeck and Cadel Evans looked to go clear in the closing stages, but they were brought back; while at the front, Pinot soloed to a 26-second margin of victory, ahead of Evans, Gallopin and the rest of the group. Kessiakoff took the polka-dot jersey from Chris Froome, as Froome's teammate Bradley Wiggins maintained the overall lead into the following day's individual time trial.

Stage 9

9 July 2012 — Arc-et-Senans to Besançon, (ITT)

The first of two lengthy individual time trial stages was fairly flat with rolling hills in the early kilometres before the parcours entered the valley of the River Doubs at Boussières. It was expected that the main contenders for the general classification were to emerge after this stage. As was customary of time trial stages, the riders set off in reverse order from where they were ranked in the general classification at the end of the previous stage. Feillu ultimately recorded a time of 57' 33" for the course, which was not bettered until the thirteenth rider to complete the course,  rider Gustav Larsson, who recorded a time over three minutes quicker than Feillu.

He completed the course in a time of 54' 19", and his time held for around an hour before his teammate Lieuwe Westra assumed top spot; despite being ten seconds down on Larsson at the second intermediate time point, Westra completed the final portion of the course some twenty seconds quicker, and recorded a time of 54' 09". 's Tony Martin, the world champion, was the next rider to assume the top spot, setting the first time underneath 54 minutes; he set a time of 53' 40", despite riding with a fractured scaphoid bone in his left wrist and suffering a flat tyre in the opening  of the stage. Fabian Cancellara of  improved the quickest time benchmark; he set the fastest time at each of the two intermediate time points on the stage, and having passed the rider who started three minutes before him on the road, 's Bauke Mollema, Cancellara established a time for the course of 52' 21", beating Martin's time by 1' 19".

His time was threatened by  rider Tejay van Garderen, as he went beneath the time of Cancellara at each of the intermediate time checks, but faded towards the end and fell nine seconds outside of his target. Chris Froome improved upon van Garderen's times at the splits, but maintained his pace until the end, setting a time half a second inside 52 minutes, beating Cancellara's time by 22 seconds. Wiggins went even quicker and by the time he had finished, he had put 35 seconds into his teammate with a time of 51' 24", winning his first Tour stage. Wiggins also put substantial time into his major general classification rivals, as the margin on the day ranged between 1' 43" for Cadel Evans who finished sixth on the stage, and 3' 29" for  rider Rein Taaramäe, who was 28th and lost the white jersey as leader of the young rider classification to van Garderen.

Stage 10

11 July 2012 — Mâcon to Bellegarde-sur-Valserine, 

The Tour then passed over the  Col de Richemond,  before the finish; the race descended towards Billiat before a gradual uphill finish in Bellegarde-sur-Valserine.

Several small attacks occurred in the early kilometres of the stage, and the peloton allowed the riders to establish an advantage off the front of the main field. After 's Michael Mørkøv took maximum points over the first climb of the day, the Côte de Corlier, the next focus was on the intermediate sprint point at Béon; Sagan launched his sprint first but was beaten to the line by both Goss and 's Yauheni Hutarovich, with Goss reducing Sagan's lead in the standings to 27 points. The breakaway group split apart on the Col du Grand Colombier; only Scarponi, 's Thomas Voeckler,  rider Luis León Sánchez and Dries Devenyns of  remained at the front.

Voeckler crossed the summit of the climb first, taking the 25 points on offer for the hors catégorie climb. The peloton crossed five-and-a-half minutes later. Voeckler also took maximum points at the Col de Richemond, and as a result, took the polka-dot jersey for the mountains classification lead from  rider Fredrik Kessiakoff. Sagan had dropped back to aid his teammate Vincenzo Nibali, who had attacked on the descent of the Col du Grand Colombier, but both riders were not to stay in front ahead of the -led peloton. 's Jens Voigt made up a minute on the lead quartet to join them, with around  remaining; Devenyns looked to go clear in the closing stages, but Voeckler had kept most in hand to take his third career Tour stage victory, three seconds ahead of Scarponi and seven ahead of Voigt.

Notes and references

Footnotes

References

Sources

External links

 

2012 Tour de France
Tour de France stages